Frederick John Lucas  (18 August 1915 – 4 October 1993) was a New Zealand military and commercial aviator, farmer, tourist operator. He was born in Dunedin, New Zealand on 18 August 1915.

References

1915 births
1993 deaths
New Zealand farmers
New Zealand aviators
Military personnel from Dunedin
Recipients of the Distinguished Flying Cross (United Kingdom)
Commercial aviators
Businesspeople from Dunedin